Beluguppa is a village in Anantapur district of the Indian state of Andhra Pradesh. It is the headquarters of Beluguppa mandal in Kalyandurg revenue division.

Geography
It has an average elevation of 458 metres (1501 ft).

Demographics
According to Indian census, 2001, the demographic details of Beluguppa mandal is as follows:
 Total Population:  40,546 in 8,402 Households
 Male Population:  20,734 and Female Population:  19,812 
 Children Under 6-years of age: 5,099 (Boys - 2,575 and Girls - 2,524)
 Total Literates:  19,447

References 

Villages in Anantapur district